"I Could Easily Fall (In Love with You)" is a song by Cliff Richard and the Shadows, released as a single in November 1964 from their album Aladdin and His Wonderful Lamp. It peaked at number 6 on the UK Singles Chart and received a silver disc for 250,000 sales.

Release
"I Could Easily Fall (In Love with You)" was written by all four members of the Shadows, who had been commissioned to write the score for the 1964 London pantomime Aladdin and His Wonderful Lamp. "I Could Easily Fall (in Love with You)" was the lead single from the show and album and was backed by another song from the album, "I'm in Love with You", which featured the Norrie Paramor Strings and backing vocals by the Mike Sammes Singers.

In May 1965, Richard released a German-language version of "I Could Easily Fall (In Love with You), titled "Es war keine so wunderbar wie du", with the B-side being a German-language version of "The Minute You're Gone", titled "Es könnte schon morgen sein".

Track listing
7": Columbia / DB 7420
 "I Could Easily Fall (In Love with You)" – 2:54
 "I'm in Love with You" – 2:38

7": Columbia / C 22 962 (Germany)
 "Es war keine so wunderbar wie du" – 2:56
 "Es könnte schon morgen sein" – 2:12

Personnel
 Cliff Richard – vocals
 Hank Marvin – lead guitar, backing vocals
 Bruce Welch – rhythm guitar, backing vocals
 John Rostill – bass guitar
 Brian Bennett – drums

Charts

"Es war keine so wunderbar wie du"

Cover versions
 In 1965, French singer Sheila released a French-language version, titled "Toujours des beaux jours", as a single, which peaked at number 1 in France and number 10 in Wallonia.
 In 1965,  Finnish singer Johnny released a Finnish-language version, titled "Rakastuin sinuun liian helposti", with the Sounds. It peaked at number 10 on the Finnish Singles Chart.
 In 1969, Swedish band Flamingokvintetten released a Swedish-language version, titled "Det är lätt att bli kär i nå'n som dig", on their album Chin Chin.

References

1964 singles
1964 songs
Cliff Richard songs
Songs written by Hank Marvin
Songs written by Bruce Welch
Songs written by Brian Bennett
Songs written by John Rostill

Columbia Graphophone Company singles
Song recordings produced by Norrie Paramor